The streak-headed honeyeater (Pycnopygius stictocephalus) is a species of bird in the family Meliphagidae.
It is found in Indonesia and Papua New Guinea.
Its natural habitat is subtropical or tropical moist lowland forests.

References

Pycnopygius
Birds described in 1876
Taxonomy articles created by Polbot